Zhou Qi  may refer to:

 Zhou Qi (born 1996), Chinese basketball player
 Zhou Qi (writer) (1814–1861), Qing dynasty writer
 Zhou Qi (biologist) (born 1970), Chinese biologist